is a passenger railway station located in the town of Shōō,  Katsuta District, Okayama Prefecture, Japan, operated by West Japan Railway Company (JR West).

Lines

Station layout
The station consists of one ground-level side platform serving a single bi-directional track. There is no station building and the station is unattended.

Adjacent stations

History
Nishi-Katsumada Station opened on October 1, 1963.  With the privatization of the Japan National Railways (JNR) on April 1, 1987, the station came under the aegis of the West Japan Railway Company. A new station building was completed in February 2021.

Passenger statistics
In fiscal 2019, the station was used by an average of 11 passengers daily..

Surrounding area
Japan National Route 179

See also
List of railway stations in Japan

References

External links

 Nishi-Katsumada Station Official Site

Railway stations in Okayama Prefecture
Kishin Line
Railway stations in Japan opened in 1963
Shōō, Okayama